Kenneth Cloudsley Clare (8 June 1929 – 11 January 1985) was a British jazz drummer.

Early life
Born in Leytonstone, Essex, England, Clare learnt to play the drums at the age of 13.

Career 
In 1947, Clare joined the Royal Air Force and played with various service bands. He played with Oscar Rabin on UK radio in his early 20s. Following this, he played with Jack Parnell and then with the Johnny Dankworth Orchestra in 1955 and remained with this orchestra for five years until September 1960. He also worked with the Dudley Moore Trio. In the 1960s, he played with Ted Heath and Ronnie Stephenson, and played in the studios as a member of Sounds Orchestral.

He stood in for Kenny Clarke from 1963 until 1966 in the Kenny Clarke-Francy Boland Big Band when Clarke was unavailable. However, from 1967 to 1971 (when the band folded), Clare was a regular paired with Clarke in what became a two-drummer band for performances, concerts, and at least 15 recordings issued by several labels. Clare also accompanied singers including Ella Fitzgerald, Tony Bennett, and Cleo Laine. On 5 December 1971, he appeared in concert at Queen Elizabeth Hall with fellow drummers Buddy Rich and Louie Bellson. Clare continued to work in the 1980s, predominantly with Dankworth and singer Cleo Laine. Clare visited Hayle in Cornwall on 16 April 1984 and performed a 'drumming duel' with former professional and local drummer Jimmy French (in the photo shown) at the Penmare Hotel.

Clare worked extensively for radio, television, film, and commercials. He served as secretary to the International Drummers Association.

Personal life and death
Clare had been admitted to Westminster Hospital, London in November 1984 and had several operations for the removal of cancer from the oesophagus. He died on 11 January 1985, aged 55. The singer Tony Bennett held a benefit concert after his death as a tribute to Clare, who was a fan of Bennett. Clare was survived by his wife, a freelance London-based singer, Marjorie Daw. They had both been members of the Oscar Rabin Band in the early 1950s; she also sang with the Don Smith Orchestra. His two adopted twin daughters both died from breast cancer. Clare's enthusiasm never drained, always devoting time to other drummers and discussing techniques and the instrument. Even while in the hospital for two months, he kept his practice pads and drumsticks next to his bed.

Legacy 
In November 2015, just over 30 years after his death, he was honoured with the installation of a blue plaque on his former east London home in Richmond Road, Leytonstone, London.

Discography
With the Kenny Clarke/Francy Boland Big Band
17 Men and Their Music (Campi, 1967)
All Smiles (MPS, 1968) 
Latin Kaleidoscope (MPS, 1968) 
Fellini 712 (MPS, 1969)
Volcano (Polydor, 1969) 
Rue Chaptal (Polydor, 1969) 
All Blues (MPS, 1969)
Clarke Boland Big Band en Concert avec Europe 1 (Tréma, 1969 [1992])
Off Limits (Polydor, 1970)
November Girl (Black Lion, 1970 [1975]) - with Carmen McRae
Change of Scenes (Verve, 1971) - with Stan Getz

References

Notes

External links
Kenny Clare Discography Discogs.com

1929 births
1985 deaths
English jazz drummers
British male drummers
Musicians from London
20th-century English musicians
20th-century drummers
20th-century British male musicians
British male jazz musicians
Kenny Clarke/Francy Boland Big Band members
Oscar Rabin Band members